Café Society was a New York City nightclub open from 1938 to 1948 on Sheridan Square in Greenwich Village. It was managed by Barney Josephson.

Overview
Josephson created the club to showcase African American talent and to be an American version of the political cabarets he had seen in Europe earlier. As well as running the first racially integrated night club in the United States, Josephson also intended the club to defy the pretensions of the rich; he chose the name to mock Clare Boothe Luce and what she referred to as "café society", the habitués of more upscale nightclubs, and that wry satirical note was carried through in murals done by Anton Refregier, a Russian immigrant who created the San Francisco Rincon Annex murals. Josephson trademarked the name Café Society, a phrase coined but not trademarked by Maury Paul, a society columnist who wrote as "Cholly Knickerbocker" for the New York Journal American. He also advertised the club as "The Wrong Place for the Right People". Josephson opened a second branch on 58th Street, between Lexington and Park Avenue, in 1940. After that, the original club was known as Café Society Downtown and the new club—intended for a different audience—as Café Society Uptown.

The club prided itself on treating black and white customers equally, unlike many venues, such as the Cotton Club, which featured black performers but barred black customers except for prominent black people in the entertainment industry. The club featured many of the greatest black musicians of the day, often imposing a strongly political bent. Billie Holiday first sang "Strange Fruit" there; at Josephson's insistence, she closed her set with this song, leaving the stage without taking any encores, so that the audience would be left to think about the meaning of the song. Lena Horne was persuaded to stop singing "When it's Sleepy Time Down South" written by Clarence Muse, Leon René and Otis René, Pearl Bailey was fired for being "too much of an Uncle Tom", and Carol Channing was fired for an impersonation of Ethel Waters. 

Relying on the keen musical judgment of John Hammond, the club's "unofficial music director", Josephson helped launch the careers of Ruth Brown, Lena Horne, dancer Pearl Primus, Hazel Scott, Pete Johnson, Albert Ammons, Big Joe Turner, and Sarah Vaughan, and popularized gospel groups such as the Dixie Hummingbirds and the Golden Gate Quartet among white audiences. Many of these acts had first been presented at Hammond's Carnegie Hall concerts, From Spirituals to Swing, in 1938 and 1939. Its defining star in the early 1940s was Josh White, who first appeared there with a gospel group, the Carolinians, then went on to head the bill as a solo performer for four years.

As part of the challenge to integrate America's segregated society, Josephson's club was the scene of numerous political events and fundraisers, often for left-wing causes, both during and after World War II. In 1947, Josephson's brother Leon Josephson was subpoenaed by the House Committee on Un-American Activities, which led to hostile comments from columnists Westbrook Pegler and Walter Winchell. Business dropped sharply as a result, and the club closed the following year.

In Summer 1948, jazz pianist Calvin Jackson played with singer Mildred Bailey and dancer Avon Long.  On December 5, 1948, dancer Pearl Primus closed a successful return engagement before heading off for a year's research in Africa on research as a Rosenewald Fellow.

1940s Manhattan telephone directories list Cafe Society, 2 Sheridan Square, CHelsea 2-2737. Today the location is Axis Theatre Company.

References

External links 
 

Nightclubs in Manhattan
African-American history in New York City
History of civil rights in the United States
Drinking establishments in Greenwich Village
Defunct jazz clubs in New York City